Soy boy is a pejorative term sometimes used in online communities to describe men perceived to be lacking masculine characteristics. The term bears many similarities and has been compared to the slang terms cuck (derived from cuckold), nu-male and low-T ("low testosterone")  terms sometimes used as an insult for male femininity by online communities.

The term is based on the presence of the phytoestrogen isoflavone in soybeans, which has led some to claim that soy products feminize men who consume them, although there is no correlation between consumption of soy phytoestrogens and testosterone or estrogen levels or sperm quality.

History 
Soy products contain high amounts of phytoestrogens. As they are structurally similar to estradiol (the major female sex hormone) and have activity at the estrogen receptor, concerns have been raised that it may act as an endocrine disruptor that adversely affects health. While there is some evidence that phytoestrogens may affect male fertility, "further investigation is needed before a firm conclusion can be drawn". Several review studies have not found any effect of phytoestrogens on sperm quality or reproductive hormone levels.

Usage 

The term is often used as an epithet by internet trolls. It is often targeted at perceived social justice warriors, vegans, liberals, and similar groups. The term has also been used in online debates about the fashion appeal of cargo shorts.

Soy boys are often depicted as feminized and unathletic, usually with glasses and a poorly-groomed beard, and having a characteristic open-mouthed smile called a "soy face" or "soylent grin."

After UFC Vegas 11 in September 2020, UFC fighter Colby Covington made disparaging reference to Nate Diaz's "soy boy diet"; Diaz is a vegan.

See also

Beta male (slang)
Neckbeard (slang)
Cuckold
Low-T
Sissy
Sexism
Soylent (meal replacement)

References 

Internet memes introduced in 2017
2010s slang
2020s slang
4chan phenomena
Effeminacy
Masculinity
Pejorative terms for men